Rua means 'street' in Portuguese and Galician language, and is the number 'two' in several Polynesian languages. It may refer to:

Music
Rua (band), a New Zealand Celtic fusion band
Rua (Clann Zú album), 2003
Rua (Moana and the Moahunters album), 1998
The Rua, a family pop rock band from Windsor, England

People
Rua Kenana Hepetipa (1869–1937), Maori self-proclaimed prophet
Rua Tipoki (born 1975), rugby union player
Rugila or Rua (died 434), warlord who united the Huns under his sole kingship by 432
Rua Van Horn (1892–1978), American educator, federal official

Surname
Antonio de la Rúa (born 1974), Argentine lawyer
Fernando de la Rúa (1937–2019), Argentine president
Jorge de la Rúa (1942–2015), Argentine government official
Matt Rua (born 1977), rugby league player
Maurício Rua (born 1981), Brazilian mixed martial arts fighter
Michele Rua (1837–1910), co-founder of the Salesian Order
Murilo Rua (born 1980), Brazilian mixed martial arts fighter
Ryan Rua (born 1990), American professional Major League Baseball player

Other uses 
Rua (Moimenta da Beira), a Portuguese parish in the municipality of Moimenta da Beira
CLG Eoghan Rua, a Gaelic Athletic Association club

See also
 RUA (disambiguation)